Education in Philadelphia, Pennsylvania has a rich and storied history. This history began with Benjamin Franklin's founding of the University of Pennsylvania as European styled school and America's first university. Today's Philadelphia region is home to nearly 300,000 college students, numerous private and parochial secondary schools, and the 8th largest school district in the country.

Public schools system: School District of Philadelphia 

Philadelphia is served by the School District of Philadelphia, which operates 242 of the city's public schools, including 163 elementary schools, 23 middle schools, and 56 high schools.

The school district is governed by the nine-member Board of education, appointed by the Mayor of Philadelphia. This Board of Education replaced the previous School Reform Commission in 2018.

There are 84 independently operated charter schools, which make up the remainder of the public schools in Philadelphia. Charter schools are authorized by the School District of Philadelphia, and are accountable to it.

Parochial schools
Philadelphia is home to the most extensive Catholic education system in the United States. Along with hundreds of parish-based elementary schools, there are also twelve Catholic high schools within the city ranging from Archdiocesan high schools to private Catholic high schools. All of the Catholic schools are affiliated with the Roman Catholic Archdiocese of Philadelphia.

Private schools
Frankford Friends School, a Quaker school grades PK-8, under the care of Frankford Monthly Meeting
French International School of Philadelphia, the French international school serving the Philadelphia area, is in nearby Bala Cynwyd, Pennsylvania.
Friends Select School, a Quaker school grades PK-12, under the care of Central Philadelphia Monthly Meeting and the Monthly Meeting of Friends of Philadelphia
Germantown Friends School, a Quaker school grades PK-12, school under the care of Germantown Monthly Meeting
Girard College, a primary and secondary educational institution, was endowed by French-American merchant, mariner and banker, Stephen Girard, opening its doors to disadvantaged youth in 1848.
Greene Street Friends School, a Quaker school grades  PK-8, school under the care of Green Street Monthly Meeting
Holmesburg Christian Academy, a non-denominational evangelical Christian school in NE Philadelphia for grades PK-8, was founded in 1975 as a ministry of Holmesburg Baptist Church.
Philadelphia Free School, a Sudbury school PK-12
Philadelphia Mennonite High School, a Mennonite high school in the  Fairmount neighborhood
Springside Chestnut Hill Academy, (formerly Springside School and Chestnut Hill Academy, respectively) a school grades PK-12 located in the Chestnut Hill section of the city
William Penn Charter School was founded by Penn in 1689, is the oldest Quaker school in the nation, under the care of the Board of Overseers.

Friends Schools League
The Friends' Schools League (FSL) is an athletic league made up of student athletes from several private high schools in the Philadelphia area in Pennsylvania and New Jersey.  As the league's name suggests, it consists primarily of Quaker schools, though in recent years several other schools have become part of the league as well.

Member schools
Member schools include:
Abington Friends School
Academy of the New Church Secondary Schools
Friends Central School
Friends Select School
George School
Germantown Friends School
Moorestown Friends School
The Shipley School
Westtown School

Miscellaneous weekend education
The Japanese Language School of Philadelphia (JLSP, フィラデルフィア日本語補習授業校 Firaderufia Nihongo Hoshū Jugyō Kō), a supplementary Japanese school, holds its classes, intended for Japanese nationals and Japanese Americans, at the Friends Central School (FCS) in nearby Wynnewood.

Higher education
Philadelphia is one of the largest college towns in the U.S., with over 120,000 college and university students enrolled within the city limits and nearly 300,000 in the metropolitan area.

References